Cactus Makes Perfect  is a 1942 short subject directed by Del Lord starring American slapstick comedy team The Three Stooges (Moe Howard, Larry Fine and Curly Howard). It is the 61st entry in the series released by Columbia Pictures starring the comedians, who released 190 shorts for the studio between 1934 and 1959.

Plot
The film opens with the Stooges' mother (played by male actor Monte Collins) attempting to wake up her three boys without success. "Get out of bed you lazy loafers!" she screams to no avail. Finally, she yanks a rope that leads from the kitchen to the bed where the trio is sleeping soundly. This causes the bed to spin horizontally until they fly off.

Curly receives a letter from the Inventors' Association, who state that his Gold Collar Button Retriever is "incomprehensible and utterly impractical." Naturally, Curly misinterprets this as a success, and the trio leave their mother's home to make their fortune. In transit, they are swindled into buying a map leading to a lost mine in the Old West. After actually finding a lost mine, the Stooges run afoul of two down-on-their-luck prospectors (Vernon Dent, Ernie Adams) after Curly fires an arrow from his Gold Collar Button Retriever. The two then try to rob the boys out of their dough. Moe and Larry flee to an abandoned hotel where Curly hid the gold in a safe. ("It's safe in the safe".) The miners show up, and they all take refuge in the safe room. The miners drill through the door, which Curly attributes to termites, and throw a stick of dynamite in. After a little back and forth, the stick fizzles out. Believing it to be a dud, the boys burst out laughing and Curly chucks the dynamite, causing it to actually explode.

Production notes
Filmed on August 7–11, 1941, the title Cactus Makes Perfect parodies the proverb "practice makes perfect."

Curly's remark, "I shoot an arrow into the air, where it lands I do not care: I get my arrows wholesale!" parodies Henry Wadsworth Longfellow's poem "The Arrow and the Song," which begins, "I shot an arrow into the air/It fell to earth, I knew not where..."

References

External links
 
 

1942 films
The Three Stooges films
American black-and-white films
Films directed by Del Lord
1940s Western (genre) comedy films
Columbia Pictures short films
American slapstick comedy films
American Western (genre) comedy films
1942 comedy films
1940s English-language films
1940s American films